In Greek mythology, Metus (Ancient Greek: Μέτους Métos) was the Egyptian son of the sea god Poseidon and Melite, daughter of King Busiris.

Note

References 

 Gaius Julius Hyginus, Fabulae from The Myths of Hyginus translated and edited by Mary Grant. University of Kansas Publications in Humanistic Studies. Online version at the Topos Text Project.

Children of Poseidon
Demigods in classical mythology